Olympus SP-350 is 8-megapixel compact digital camera. The model was announced by its maker on August 29, 2005. 

It has the following specifications:
 Sensor size: 1/1.8 " (7.18 x 5.32 mm)
 CCD Sensor with 8.1 million effective pixels (8.3 million photo detectors)
 Maximum resolution:  3264 x 2488
 Optional resolutions: 2592 x 1944, 2288 x 1712, 2048 x 1536, 1600 x 1200, 1280 x 960, 1024 x 768, 640 x 480
 Image ratio w:h: 4:3 or 3:2
 Color filter array:  RGB
 ISO settings : Auto, 50, 100, 200, 400
 Zoom wide: 8mm  (38 mm equivalent)
 Zoom telephoto: 24mm  (114 mm equivalent ) (3 x)
 Aperture range: F2.8 - F4.9
 5x Digital zoom
 Auto Focus (TTL) & Manual Focus
 Normal focus range: 20 cm
 Macro focus range: 5 cm
 White balance override: 5 positions
 Min shutter speed: 15 sec + Bulb
 Max shutter speed: 1/2000 sec
 Built-in Flash
 Flash guide no.: 3.8 m (12.4 ft) 8 m
 External flash with hot shoe
 Flash modes: Auto, Red-Eye, Forced, Off, Slow 1&2
 Exposure compensation range: -2 to +2 EV in 1/3 EV steps
 Metering options: ESP multi-pattern, CW Avg, Spot
 Shooting modes:  aperture priority, shutter priority, manual, scene modes, movie mode
 Optional adapter available (lens threads)
 Continuous Drive:  2.4/1.4 frame/s for 2/8 images
 Movie clips sizes:  640 x 480 (15 frames per second), 320 x 240 (30 frame/s)
 Self-timer
 Storage types:  xD flash media & 32 MB internal / built-in
 Uncompressed format: RAW
 Compressed format: JPEG (Exif 2.2)
 Jpeg quality levels: standard quality (SQ), high quality (HQ) &  super high quality (SHQ)
 Optical Viewfinder
 LCD screen size: 2.5 inches diagonally
 LCD resolution: 115,000 pixels
 Battery types:   AA (2) batteries or CRV3
 Weight including batteries:  245 g (8.6 oz)
 Dimensions:  100 x 65 x 35 mm (3.9 x 2.6 x 1.4 in)

Olympus released a firmware update that was rumored to address battery life problems. However, battery life is still poor with alkaline batteries, below average with nickel metal halides batteries and good with lithium batteries (CRV3s).

References

SP-350
Cameras introduced in 2005